Chengkam Sangma (born 10 October 1994) is an Indian cricketer. He made his List A debut for Meghalaya in the 2018–19 Vijay Hazare Trophy on 20 September 2018. He made his first-class debut for Meghalaya in the 2018–19 Ranji Trophy on 1 November 2018. He made his Twenty20 debut on 15 November 2019, for Meghalaya in the 2019–20 Syed Mushtaq Ali Trophy.

References

External links
 

1994 births
Living people
Indian cricketers
Meghalaya cricketers
Place of birth missing (living people)